Wilson Mukama is a Tanzanian CCM politician and former Secretary General of Chama Cha Mapinduzi.

References

Living people
Tanzanian civil servants
Chama Cha Mapinduzi politicians
1949 births